You Need Love may refer to:
"You Need Love (Muddy Waters song)" a single by Muddy Waters, later covered by Small Faces
"You Need Love (Styx song)" a single by Styx